Empty nose syndrome (ENS) is a potential complication of surgery to the nasal turbinates. ENS is a clinical syndrome that is often referred to as one form of secondary atrophic rhinitis in the medical literature. People with ENS have usually undergone a turbinectomy (removal or reduction of turbinates, structures inside the nose) or other surgical procedures that reduce or injure the nasal turbinates. The overall incidence of ENS is unknown due to the lack of a reliable epidemiological study or International Classification of Diseases (ICD-10) code. According to this article, Dr. Talmadge noted that "many cases likely go unrecognized or underdiagnosed, and therefore unreported."

People with ENS may experience a range of symptoms, most commonly feelings of nasal obstruction, nasal dryness and crusting, and a sensation of being unable to breathe.

The condition is caused by medical interventions and can be caused by any surgery or procedure involving the nasal turbinates.  This includes both minor "conservative" surgical procedures as well as total turbinate resection. It is often seen with people who have unobstructed nasal passages following surgical intervention but report suffocation or obstruction. Previously doctors believed ENS was limited to those with complete turbinate resection but through further research it has been found in patients with a range of surgeries/procedures to the nasal turbinates.

The existence as a medical condition was previously controversial and has recently been more accepted in the ear, nose and throat (ENT) specialists and plastic surgeon community but corrective surgical methods are experimental and limited to a few ENTs worldwide. This is due to many ENTs and plastic surgeons not fully understanding the airflow changes that occur when they modify the nose, a lack of understanding in why some patients exhibit the symptoms while others do not and incorrectly assuming that patients exhibiting ENS symptoms are due to mental illness. Despite all aspects of it having been subject to debate, including whether it should be considered solely rhinologic or whether it may have neurological or psychosomatic aspects, it has recently been gaining more acceptance in the ENT community.

Signs and symptoms
The major symptoms of ENS include suffocation, nasal dryness, nasal burning, nasal openness, nasal crusting, and/or an impaired sense of airflow through the nose. ENS greatly reduces a patient's quality of life and many patients struggle to complete activities of daily living. While ENS is physical in its origin, many ENS patients also struggle with depression, anxiety, and sleep disturbances. Individuals with ENS may not experience all of these symptoms.

A study with a very small number of ENS patients (22) found that ENS was associated with hyperventilation syndrome (HVS) in 77.3% of the study population. The study suggests, but does not prove, that there could be an epidemiological link between ENS and HVS.  The authors hypothesize that the link between ENS and HVS could be explained by the nasal injury that occurs to the turbinates that alters the respiratory control system.

Cause
The cause of ENS is due to the body not accepting the new airflow in the nasal passages following surgical procedures. The nose is an incredibly complex area of the body and one that has been very poorly researched in terms of the effects on aerodynamics from surgical procedures. In many patients with ENS, the airflow is modeled as being more turbulent with less laminar flow across the mucosa. This change in airflow leads to an imbalance of / levels in the body, which will show hyperventilation-like symptoms in patients. This reduced amount of mucus in the nose can also be attributed to the change in airflow often resulting in dry cool air hitting the back of the patients throat. x

One possible cause may be changes to the nasal mucous membrane and to the nerve endings in the mucosa resulting from chronic changes to the temperature and humidity of the air flowing inside the nose, caused in turn by removal or reduction of the turbinates. Direct damage to the nerves may be a result of surgical intervention; however, as of 2015, there is no technology that allows the mapping of the sensory nerves within the nose, so it is difficult to determine whether this is causative of ENS. Investigators have been unable to identify consistent diagnostic or precipitating features, psychological causes leading to a psychosomatic condition have been proposed.

There seems to be a relation between reduced levels of nasal nitric oxide and depression/anxiety symptoms in ENS patients. Both have been shown to be reversible via implantation surgery.

It has been proposed, that the airflow in ENS patients is changed so that most of the air flows through the middle meatus, compared to most of the air flowing through the inferior meatus in healthy individuals. This can be corrected via inferior meatus augmentation (IMAP surgery).

Diagnosis

No consensus criteria exist for the diagnosis of ENS and many ENTs will wait a year before diagnosing in hopes the patient accepts the new airflow; it is typically diagnosed by ruling out other conditions, with ENS remaining the likely diagnosis if the signs and symptoms are present. A "cotton test" has been proposed, in which moist cotton is held where a turbinate should be or in various locations in the nasal passages, to see if it provides relief and an airflow pattern that allows for natural breathing; while this has not been validated nor is it widely accepted, it may be useful to identify which people may benefit from surgery.

As of 2015, protocols for using rhinomanometry to diagnose ENS and measure response to surgery were under development, as was a standardized clinical instrument (a well defined and validated questionnaire) to obtain more useful reporting of symptoms.

A validated ENS-specific, 6-item questionnaire called the Empty Nose Syndrome 6-item Questionnaire (ENS6Q) was developed as an adjunct to the standard Sino-Nasal Outcome Test 22 (SNOT-22). The ENS6Q is the first validated, specific, adjunct questionnaire to the SNOT-22. It can more reliably identify patients suspected of ENS. The ENS6Q is gaining usage in studies on ENS.

Classification

Four types have been proposed:
 ENS-IT: Inferior turbinate (IT) was fully or partially resected 
 ENS-MT: Middle turbinate (MT) was fully or partially resected 
 ENS-both: Both the IT and MT were both at least partially resected 
 ENS-type: Patient appears to have adequate turbinate tissue but suffers ENS symptoms due to damage to the mucosal surface of the turbinates.

Prevention
Attempt non surgical methods for an extended period of time prior to surgical intervention. Avoid any unnecessary nasal surgery, avoid any surgical treatment to the turbinates and septum, seek multiple consults for any nasal surgery, conduct imagery on the nasal passages prior to any surgical treatment, seek opinions from surgeons familiar with ENS. Many surgeons will tell patients that ENS is only seen in patients that have excessive turbinate reduction, but studies have shown that any surgery/procedure involving the nasal turbinates can potentially lead to ENS. For this reason it is critical that anyone planning any surgery to the nose for function or appearance should be aware of the high risk of ENS developing if the body does not accept the new airflow and exchange of gasses.

Treatment
Treatment of ENS by many ENTs is extremely limited with very marginal success rates once diagnosed. Initial treatment is similar to atrophic rhinitis, namely keeping the nasal mucosa moist with saline or oil-based lubricants and treating pain and infection as they arise; adding menthol to lubricants may be helpful in ENS, as may be use of a cool mist humidifier at home but has limited success and many ENT patients seek treatment from the few ENTs well educated in ENS surgical techniques. For people with anxiety, depression, or who are obsessed with the feeling that they can't breathe, psychiatric or psychological care may be helpful.

In some people, surgery to restore missing or reduced turbinates or various fillers that correct the airflow in the nose may be beneficial.

A 2015 meta-analysis identified 128 people treated with surgery from eight studies that were useful to pool, with an age range of 18 to 64, most of whom had been experiencing ENS symptoms for many years. The most common surgical approach was creating a pocket under the mucosa and implanting material - the amount and location were based on the judgement of the surgeon. In about half the cases a filler such as noncellular dermis, a medical-grade porous high-density polyethylene, or silastic was used and in about 40% cartilage taken from the person or from a cow was used. In a few cases hyaluronic acid was injected and in a few others tricalcium phosphate was used. There were no complications caused by the surgery, although one person was over-corrected and developed chronic rhinosinusitis and two people were under-corrected. The hyaluronic acid was completely resorbed in the three people who received it at the one year follow up, and in six people some of the implant came out, but this did not affect the result as enough remained. About 21% of the people had no or marginal improvement but the rest reported significant relief of their symptoms. Since none of the studies used placebo or blinding there may be a strong placebo effect or bias in reporting.

Outcomes
Data measuring the prevalence of Empty Nose Syndrome (ENS) after turbinate surgery is limited to a few single surgeon studies with variable results. Measuring prevalence is challenging as ENS symptoms may not show up for many years after the surgery and the surgeon may no longer be following the patients. Quantifying prevalence will also depend on a valid, standardized definition.

The lack of a reliable epidemiological study or ICD-10 code makes it difficult to understand the incidence of ENS. Qualitative feedback from ENTs that treat this disease indicate that the incidence is underestimated but the condition is debilitating for those that have it.

Untreated, the condition can cause significant and long term physical and emotional distress in some people; some of the initial presentations on the condition described people who committed suicide. Research on safety and efficacy of existing treatments is limited to a handful of published studies with a small number of participants and self-reported results from specialists treating this condition.

History
As early as 1914, Dr Albert Mason reported cases of "a condition resembling atrophic rhinitis" with "a dryness of the nose and throat" following turbinectomy. Mason called the turbinates "the most important organ in the nose" and claimed they were "slaughtered and removed with discriminate abandon more than any other part of the body, with the possible exception of the prepuce."

The term "Empty Nose Syndrome" was first used by Eugene Kern and Monika Stenkvist of the Mayo Clinic in 1994. Kern and Eric Moore published a case study of 242 people with secondary atrophic rhinitis in 2001 and were the first to attribute the cause to prior sinonasal surgery in the scientific literature. Whether the condition existed or not and whether surgery was a cause, was hotly debated at Nose 2000, a meeting of the International Rhinologic Society that occurs every four years, and continued to be debated thereafter at scientific meetings and in the literature; as an example of how heated the debate became, in a 2002 textbook on nasal reconstruction techniques, two surgeons from University of Utrecht called turbinectomies a "nasal crime".

Society and culture
As of 2016, according to Spencer Payne, a doctor who studies ENS, many people with ENS symptoms commonly encounter doctors who consider their symptoms to be purely psychological; according to Subinoy Das, another doctor who studies ENS, recognition among rhinologists was growing.

People who experience ENS have formed online communities to support one another and to advocate for recognition, prevention, and treatments for ENS.

References

External links 
 American Rhinologic Society: Empty nose syndrome
United Kingdom National Health Service: Atrophic Rhinitis Causes

Nose disorders
Human head and neck